Brazilian legend Zico was appointed as the club's manager at the start of the season following the departure of Valery Gazzaev. Zico left the club in September, being replaced by Juande Ramos, who only lasted 47 days before being replaced by Leonid Slutsky.

Squad

Out on loan

Transfers

In

Loans in

Out

Loans out

Released

Competitions

UEFA Cup

Knockout stage

Super Cup

Premier League

Results by round

Results

League table

Russian Cup

2008-09

Final

2009-10

UEFA Champions League

Group stage

Statistics

Appearances and goals

|-
|colspan="14"|Players that left CSKA Moscow on loan during the season:

|-
|colspan="14"|Players who appeared for CSKA Moscow that left during the season:

|}

Goal Scorers

Clean sheets

Disciplinary Record

References

PFC CSKA Moscow seasons
CSKA Moscow